Canyon Apache is a Lucky Luke comic written by Goscinny and Morris. It was first published by Dargaud in French in the year 1971. English editions have been published by Knight Books, in 1977, and Cinebook in 2009, under the title Apache Canyon.

Synopsis 
Lucky Luke is responsible for bringing peace between Colonel O'Nolan's cavalry and Patronimo's Apache tribe. There has been war ever since the Apaches kidnapped his son. Being considered a traitor to the cavalry, he joins the Apaches to prevent war that way, taking on the name of 'Lucky Luko'. However, he is soon considered a traitor to the Apaches too. When Colonel O'Nolan is captured, they find out, just before they are to be executed, that the medicine man, who is to be killing them, is O'Nolan's son, and Patronimo is not a real Apache - his father, Bisteco, the previous chief who disappeared years ago, is Lazlo Bystek, who lives in New York.

Characters 

 Colonel O'Nolan: Fort Canyon Commander.
 Sergeants O'Malley, O'Hara, O'Dwyer and O'Flanagan: Irish sergeants at the fort (although one is half-Scots, leading to him being mocked by the others).
 Patronimo: Chief of the Apaches.
 Coyotito: Apache child.
 Lazlo Bystek: father of Patronimo, once chief of the Apaches

References

 Morris publications in Spirou BDoubliées

External links
Lucky Luke official site album index 
Goscinny website on Lucky Luke

Comics by Morris (cartoonist)
Lucky Luke albums
1971 graphic novels
Works by René Goscinny